The 1894 Oberlin Yeomen football team represented Oberlin College during the 1894 college football season.  In its second and final season under head coach John Heisman, the team compiled a record of 4–3–1.

Schedule

References

Oberlin
Oberlin Yeomen football seasons
Oberlin Yeomen football